Mamady Diarra (born 26 June 2000) is a Malian footballer who plays as a left winger for Spanish club Cádiz CF Mirandilla.

Club career
Born in Bamako, Diarra began his career with local side Yeelen Olympique. On 2 May 2019, he signed a four-year contract with Spanish side Cádiz CF, being initially assigned to the reserves in Segunda División B.

Diarra made his senior debut for Cádiz B on 1 September 2019, coming on as a late substitute in a 2–1 away loss against Yeclano Deportivo. He scored his first senior goal on 27 February 2022, netting the winner in a 1–0 Segunda División RFEF win over UD Las Palmas Atlético.

Diarra made his first team – and La Liga – debut on 14 August 2022, replacing Joseba Zaldúa in a 1–0 loss at Real Sociedad.

References

External links
 
 

2000 births
Living people
People from Bamako
Malian footballers
Association football wingers
La Liga players
Segunda División B players
Segunda Federación players
Cádiz CF B players
Cádiz CF players
Mali youth international footballers
Malian expatriate footballers
Malian expatriate sportspeople in Spain
Expatriate footballers in Spain